Shefter is a surname. Notable people with the surname include:

Bert Shefter (1902–1999), Russian-born film composer
Martin Shefter (born 1943), American political scientist and author
Milt Shefter, American film and media-asset archivist and preservationist

See also
 Adam Schefter